Ericrocis pintada is a species of bee in the family Apidae. It is found in Central America and North America.

References

External links

 

Apinae
Articles created by Qbugbot
Insects described in 1984